Sissach railway station is a railway station in the municipality of Sissach, in the Swiss canton of Basel-Landschaft. It is an intermediate stop on the standard gauge Hauenstein line of Swiss Federal Railways.

Services 
 the following services stop at Sissach:

 InterRegio:
 hourly service between Basel SBB and Zürich Hauptbahnhof.
 Basel trinational S-Bahn:
 : half-hourly service between Laufen and Olten, with every other train continuing from Laufen to Porrentruy.
 : hourly service via the summit line to Olten.

References

External links 
 
 

Railway stations in Basel-Landschaft
Swiss Federal Railways stations